In rail transport, a cow-calf (also cow and calf, or in the  master and slave) is a set of switcher-type diesel locomotives. The set usually is a pair; some three-unit sets (with two calves, also known as herds) were built, but this was rare. A cow is equipped with a cab; a calf is not. The two are coupled together (either with regular couplers or a semi-permanent drawbar) and equipped with multiple unit train control so that both locomotives can be operated from the single cab.

Cows are analogous to A units (locomotives with a cab) and calves to B unit (powered locomotives without a cab) road locomotives. The cow and calf are both equipped with prime movers for propulsion. Like the early EMD FT locomotives, the cow-calf sets were typically built as mated pairs, with the cow (or cabbed unit) and calf (or cabless unit) sharing a number. However this was not always the case, as over time many of the sets were broken up and couplers added to aid with versatility. Cow-calf locomotives can be distinguished from the sometimes very similar looking slug and slug mother sets by the fact that both cows and calves are independently powered, while slugs are engineless, and dependent on power from their "mother" units.

Most cow-calf sets were built by Electro-Motive Division (EMD), although other examples were built by the American Locomotive Company, Baldwin Locomotive Works, and British Rail (the latter by combining existing locomotives together). Cow-calf sets were made obsolete by the development of road switcher locomotives, which could handle both mainline trains and switching duties.

Distinctions between cow-calf, B units, and slugs 

Cow-calf sets are similar to slugs (cut-down locomotives which do not have their own engines, but may have control cabs) and especially B units (powered booster locomotives which do not have cabs). They differ from both in that a B unit is designed to operate with any other locomotives, while cow-calf sets are meant to be semi-permanently coupled to each other with a drawbar and operated together, though some cow-calf sets used standard couplers instead.

A slug is semi-permanently paired with a cabbed unit, but does not have its own engine. At low speeds, many diesel-electric locomotives generate more electrical current than can be used by their motors. Slugs use this excess current to power their traction motors. In contrast, all units in a cow-calf set have their own engines.

History

Design and nomenclature 
In a cow-calf set, the cow referred to the locomotive equipped with a cab, while calves lacked a cab. Cow-calf sets with two calves are known as "herds"; the only example of these were two TR3 series sets ordered by the Chesapeake and Ohio Railway. The cow, calf, and herd designations were nicknames.

Cow-calf locomotives were designed for both transferring railroad cars between nearby classification yards in urban areas, and for switching within yards. They were built with an emphasis on tractive effort, with top speed of lesser importance.

Production and operations 

Most cow-calf sets were built between the 1930s and the 1950s. They were built by several different makers, although General Motors' Electro-Motive Division built far more than the others, chiefly its TR (transfer) series. In addition to the transfer duties they were designed for, cow-calf sets were also used in hump yards to send cuts of cars over the hump for classification.

The Union Pacific Railroad made use of cow-calf sets as helpers on a steep grade near Kelso, California, until 1959, when the use of multiple-unit train control made them obsolete. Most American examples were replaced by road switcher locomotives. The Belt Railway of Chicago was the final holdout, continuing to operate TR2 and TR4 sets into the 1980s and 1990s.

List of cow-calf models

TR series 
EMD's TR (transfer) series were the largest group of cow-calf locomotives built. Produced in seven models, eighty were built between 1940 and 1953, along with two additional calves.
 EMD TR
 EMD TR1
 EMD TR2
 EMD TR3
 EMD TR4
 EMD TR5
 EMD TR6

Other cow-calf models 
The American Locomotive Company (ALCO) built two cow-calf sets, derived from the ALCO S-6 and designated SSB-9.

Baldwin Locomotive Works produced nine cow-calf versions of the Baldwin S-8. Both ALCO and Baldwin's cow-calf sets all went to customer Oliver Mining.

Cow-calf locomotives in the United Kingdom are generally referred to as 'master and slave' locomotives. Three sets were created by British Rail in 1965 by permanently coupling pairs   locomotives dating from 1959 and 1962, the cab and controls being removed from the calf. They were designated  and operated at Tinsley Marshalling Yard, the last being withdrawn in 1985. British Steel created some in a similar manner in 1971 for use at Port Talbot Steelworks. Four  locomotives built by Brush Traction between 1954 and 1957 had their cabs removed and control gear moved into a metal cabinet as slaves. Five similar locomotives were equipped to work as masters. The conversions were done in 1971 and they were taken out of service in 1986.

See also
 Slug (railroad)
 Twin unit

References 

 
Diesel locomotives